Peter Darling (born 25 October 1963) is an English dancer and choreographer best known for his award-winning work in Billy Elliot the Musical.

In 2010 he choreographed Matilda the Musical at the RSC's Courtyard Theatre, which has since transferred to the West End and Broadway. He also choreographed for another Roahl Dahl stage adaption, Charlie and the Chocolate Factory.  In 2015, it was announced he had teamed up with the creative team from Matilda to choreograph Groundhog Day. The musical transferred to The Old Vic in 2016, running through to September.

He was educated at Alleyn's School.

References

External links
 
 

Living people
English choreographers
English male dancers
Laurence Olivier Award winners
Tony Award winners
National Dance Award winners
People educated at Alleyn's School
Helpmann Award winners
1963 births